Hasanabad (also Romanized as Ḩasanābād) is a village in Quchan Atiq Rural District, in the Central District of Quchan County, Razavi Khorasan Province, Iran. At the 2006 census, its population was 598, in 176 families.

References 

Populated places in Quchan County